James Hewitt, 1st Viscount Lifford (28 April 1712 – 28 April 1789) was an Anglo-Irish politician, lawyer and judge. He served as Lord Chancellor of Ireland from 1767 to 1789.

Background
Hewitt was the son of a Coventry draper, William Hewitt (1683–1747), who was born in Rockcliffe, Cumberland, the son of James Hewitt and Mary Urwin. The judge's mother was Hannah Lewis. His brother, William Hewitt (1719–1781), was Governor-general of the West Indies, a position he obtained through his brother's influence with the Government. In a class-conscious age, his background was something of a handicap, and his "small-town" manners were the subject of unkind comments throughout his life.

Career
Hewitt first worked as an attorney's clerk. By 1742, he had become a barrister. Rising quickly through the legal profession, his career climaxed when he was made Lord Chancellor of Ireland in 1767, a post he held until his death in 1789. He was raised to the Peerage of Ireland as Baron Lifford, of Lifford in the County of Donegal, in 1768, and was further honoured when he was made Viscount Lifford in 1781, also in the Irish peerage.

He was elected Member of Parliament (MP) for Coventry for 1761 to 1766. He was not highly regarded as a Parliamentarian: his fellow MPs complained that his speeches were almost inaudible.

Character and Reputation
Lord Lifford made his reputation as Lord Chancellor of Ireland: until then he had the name of being a "dull, heavy lawyer", an uninspiring though "safe" MP, and a man of mediocre intelligence, who was painfully conscious of his rather humble origins. Even the Government which chose him, while praising him as a good lawyer and an honest man, was rather doubtful that he had the necessary strength of character to be an effective Lord Chancellor, while the English Bench reacted to his appointment with general ridicule.

They were quickly proved wrong: within two years of his arrival in Ireland, Lord Lifford was earning the highest praises as a judge. As his colleague in the Irish Government John Hely-Hutchinson (not a man normally given to speaking well of others) wrote to a friend-

"He does his business very ably and expeditiously and to the general satisfaction of suitors and practicers in this country, where he is much respected and a very popular character and is, in his public and private deportment, a most worthy, honest anamiable man."

His efficiency in doing business was such that it was said that virtually all equity litigation in his time was diverted to Chancery (this may have been partly because the Court of Exchequer, which had a competing equity jurisdiction, was notoriously slow and  inefficient; it had been described earlier in the century as being in a state of "confusion and disorder beyond remedy").

Barristers who practised in his court, like John Philpot Curran, fondly recalled "the great Lord Lifford" after his death, and cited him as a model for other judges to follow.

Family
Lord Lifford married firstly Mary Rhys Williams, daughter of the Rev. Rhys (or Price) Williams of Stapleford Abbotts, Essex, Archdeacon of Carmarthen, in 1749, by whom he had four sons, including James, his heir, John, Dean of Cloyne, and Joseph Hewitt (1754–1794), justice of the Court of King's Bench (Ireland). She died in 1765. His second wife was Ambrosia Bayley, daughter of the Rev. Charles Bayley of Navestock and Elizabeth Beck, whom he married in 1766: her youth and beauty aroused much admiration in Ireland. By Ambrosia, he had one further son and two daughters. He was succeeded by his eldest son, James Hewitt, 2nd Viscount Lifford (1750–1830). He lived at Belvedere House, Drumcondra. Ambrosia died in 1807.

Arms

References

|-

1712 births
1789 deaths
18th-century Anglo-Irish people
Viscounts in the Peerage of Ireland
Peers of Ireland created by George III
Lord chancellors of Ireland
Justices of the King's Bench
Members of the Privy Council of Ireland
Members of the Parliament of Great Britain for English constituencies
British MPs 1761–1768
Members of Parliament for Coventry
People from the City of Carlisle